Fanatics is a 2012 Finnish comedy film directed by Teppo Airaksinen.

Cast 
 Eero Ritala as Petri Larvio
 Joonas Saartamo as Komentaja
 Jussi Vatanen as Tuukka Tiensuu
  as Emmi
  as Vesander
 Janne Ravi as Sarttila
  as Terho
 Markus Turunen as Jari
  as Matias
  as Hannele

References

External links 

2012 comedy films
2012 films
Finnish comedy films